Lázaro Renato Rashid Aguilar (9 November 1975) is a Paralympian athlete from Cuba competing mainly in category T12 middle-distance events.

He competed in the 2008 Summer Paralympics in Beijing, China.  There he won a silver medal in the men's 800 metres - T12 event and a silver medal in the men's 1500 metres - T13 event

References

External links 
 

Paralympic athletes of Cuba
Athletes (track and field) at the 2008 Summer Paralympics
Paralympic silver medalists for Cuba
Living people
World record holders in Paralympic athletics
Year of birth missing (living people)
Medalists at the 2008 Summer Paralympics
Paralympic medalists in athletics (track and field)
Cuban male middle-distance runners